The .280 Flanged Nitro Express, also known as the .280 Lancaster, is an obsolete rimmed bottleneck centerfire rifle cartridge developed by Charles Lancaster and introduced in 1906.

Overview
The introduction of the semi-rimmed .280 Ross in 1906 caused considerable interest amongst sportsmen and gunmakers.  Gunmakers Charles Lancaster introduced the rimmed .280 Flanged Nitro Express later by in the same year for use in single shot and double rifles.  The .280 Flanged Nitro Express is very similar to the .280 Ross, although loaded to slightly lower velocities.

Like the .280 Ross, the popularity of the .280 Flanged Nitro Express waned after a number of hunters were killed by the dangerous game they were attempting to hunt with the cartridge.

The .280 Flanged Nitro Express was said to have been a favourite of King George V.

See also
 List of rifle cartridges
 Nitro Express

References

External links
 Ammo-One, ".280 Flanged, .280 Lancaster", ammo-one.com, retrieved 3 February 2018.
 Cartridgecollector, ".280 Flanged " (Lancaster)", cartridgecollector.net, retrieved 3 February 2018.
 Imperial War Museums, "7 X 66R: Kynoch; .280 Flanged Nitro-Express", iwm.org.uk, retrieved 3 February 2018.
 The Spanish Association of Cartridge Collectors, ".280 Flanged Nitro Express", municion.org , retrieved 3 February 2018.

Pistol and rifle cartridges
British firearm cartridges
Weapons and ammunition introduced in 1906